= Firmin Le Ver =

Firmin Le Ver (born between 1370 and 1375; died 1444), in Latin Firminus Verris, was a French Carthusian monk, philologist, and lexicographer.

== Life ==
Firmin Le Ver was the prior of the Saint-Honoré Carthusian monastery in Thuison, near Abbeville. Apparently with the intent of using it in his monastery, he spent the years 1420 to 1440 writing a Latin-French dictionary, the first in its kind of which the author is known. With over 45,000 entries, that are explained both in Latin and French, his dictionary is exceptionally rich for its age. All in all, the Le Ver's dictionary is about 540,000 words long, a sixth of which are French.

Le Ver died in Abbeville in 1444.

The manuscript of Le Ver's dictionary is kept in the Bibliothèque nationale de France. Although it was already described in 1868, it was only published scientifically for the first time in 1994.

== Work ==
- Verris, F. (1994). Dictionarius, Dictionnaire latin-français de Firmin Le Ver (B. Merrilees & W. Edwards, Eds.). Turnhout: Brepols.
